Paul Jabara & Friends is the fourth studio album by American actor, singer and songwriter Paul Jabara, best known for writing Donna Summer's hit "Last Dance" and the Summer/Barbra Streisand duet "No More Tears (Enough Is Enough)". The album includes the multimillion-selling single release "It's Raining Men" by The Weather Girls, written and produced by Jabara in late 1982.

Paul Jabara & Friends was released in 1983 on the CBS Records label, with guest vocalists including The Weather Girls and Leata Galloway. It also features vocals of a 16-year-old (when recorded) relatively unknown R&B singer named Whitney Houston.

The tracks "It's Raining Men" and "Hope" were both included on the Weather Girls' 1983 debut album  Success and the album also featured a song co-written by Diana Ross and Paul Jabara ("Ladies Hot Line").

Track listing

Side one
1."Bad Habits" - 3:15 

2."Ladies Hot Line" - 4:40 

3."Hurricane Joe" [featuring Leata Galloway] - 4:58
 
4."It's Raining Men" [featuring The Weather Girls] - 5:27 

Side two
1."Eternal Love" [featuring Whitney Houston] - 6:29 

2."What's Become of Love" [featuring Leata Galloway] - 4:10 

3."Hope" [featuring The Weather Girls] - 5:16

Notes
"Eternal Love" was included in the set list during Whitney Houston's first headlining tour, The Greatest Love World Tour, in 1986.

Personnel
Buddy Williams (tracks 1, 2, 5, 7), Carlos Vega (track 4), Keith Forsey (track 3) - drums
Marcus Miller (tracks 1, 2, 6) - Fender bass
Lee Sklar (track 4), Les Hurdle (track 3), Neil Jason (tracks 5, 7) - bass
Bob Esty (track 4), Greg Mathieson (track 3), Leon Pendarvis, Jr., Paul Shaffer (tracks 1, 2, 5, 7) - keyboards
David Spinozza, George Waldenius (tracks 1, 2, 5, 7), Marty Walsh (track 3), Michael Landau (track 4) - guitar
Bob Esty, Paul Delph (track 4), Paul Shaffer (tracks 3, 5, 7) - synthesizer
Jerry Solomon - recording, mixing
Charles Koppelman - executive producer

References

External links
Paul Jabara - Paul Jabara and Friends (CD, Album). Discogs

Paul Jabara albums
1983 albums
CBS Records albums